The UEFA Euro 1996 qualifying play-off was a UEFA Euro 1996 qualifying match to decide the final participant for UEFA Euro 1996. It was played on 13 December 1995 at Anfield in Liverpool, England, a neutral venue, between the Republic of Ireland and the Netherlands. The Netherlands won 2–0, therefore qualifying for the 1996 European Championship.

Background
The UEFA Euro 1996 qualifying group stage consisted of eight groups with five or six countries in each group. Each group winner would qualify for Euro 1996, and the eight group runners-up would be compared in a separate table. The top six countries would automatically qualify for Euro 1996, while the bottom two countries would face each other in a one-off match playoff to determine the sixteenth and last team that would participate in the next summer's European Championship.

Netherlands (Group 5)

After the 1994 FIFA World Cup the Netherlands started he qualifying campaign for Euro 1996 under coach Dick Advocaat. In December, Advocaat moved to PSV Eindhoven, where he succeeded Kees Rijvers as head coach. In January 1995 48-year-old Guus Hiddink took charge of the national team. Under the new coach, the Netherlands finished second in Group 5, 1 point behind the Czech Republic, and tied at 20 points with Norway. The Netherlands had the better head-to-head against Norway, thus putting the Dutch in second place.

Republic of Ireland (Group 6)

The Republic of Ireland had a strong start to their group, when they won their opening three games, including a 4–0 win against Northern Ireland. The Republic's next game was also against Northern Ireland, although the result was a 1–1 draw. From that point onwards the Republic stuttered badly as injuries struck down key players such as Roy Keane, Andy Townsend, John Sheridan and Steve Staunton. After beating the highly fancied Portugal, the Irish then endured an embarrassing 0–0 draw to Liechtenstein (this was Liechtenstein's only point in their ten matches), before losing twice to Austria, on both occasions by three goals to one. Although they defeated Latvia, Ireland needed to beat Portugal in Lisbon to qualify outright, but lost 3–0. The Republic of Ireland therefore finished second in Group 6, 6 points behind Portugal, and tied at 17 points with Northern Ireland. The Republic of Ireland had the better head-to-head against Northern Ireland, thus putting the Republic of Ireland in second place.

Ranking of second-placed teams
The runners-up of each of the eight groups were placed in a table to decide which seven of them would qualify. The best six runners-up would qualify automatically, while the two worst would play-off on a neutral ground to determine the final qualifier. To determine the two worst runners-up, a comparison was made between all of them. Only matches played against teams that finished first, third and fourth were regarded. The Netherlands finished seventh in the table, while the Republic of Ireland finished eighth and last, therefore qualifying both countries to the play-off.

Summary

|}

Match

Summary
Dutch forward Patrick Kluivert opened the scoring with a low shot to the right corner after 29 minutes to put the Netherlands ahead. Kluivert then wrapped the match up with his second goal, lifting the ball over the advancing Alan Kelly with two minutes to go, giving the Netherlands a 2–0 win and sending them through to Euro 1996.

Details

Goalscorers

Aftermath

After failing to qualify for the European Championship, Republic of Ireland manager Jack Charlton resigned shortly after the game. Charlton bid Irish fans an emotional farewell after ten memorable years in charge which saw him help Ireland qualify for their first ever European Championship in 1988 and their first and second ever World Cups in 1990 and 1994.

The Netherlands advanced on to Euro 1996, where they finished second in Group A behind hosts England, thus qualifying them for the knockout stage. In the quarter-finals, they drew 0–0 after extra time to France, before losing 4–5 on penalties, as Clarence Seedorf missed his spot kick.

References

UEFA Euro 1996 qualifying
European Championship
Netherlands at UEFA Euro 1996
1996
1996
UEFA European Championship matches
December 1995 sports events in the United Kingdom
1990s in Liverpool
International sports competitions in Liverpool
International association football competitions hosted by England